Elizabeth Lehman Belen (December 22, 1886July 24, 1975) was an American politician who served as a member of the Michigan House of Representatives from 1937 to 1938. She was the first Democratic woman elected to the Michigan Legislature. She served as a delegate to the 1940 and 1944 Democratic National Conventions.

Belen was drafted by the Army during the Spanish flu outbreak of 1918. She later founded the Visiting Nurses Service in the 1920s. In 1950, she unsuccessfully ran for a seat in the Michigan Senate. From 1939 to 1943 she was the vice chairman of the Democratic State Central Committee for Michigan. Belen was inducted into the Michigan Women's Hall of Fame in 2014.

References 

20th-century American politicians
20th-century American women politicians
Women state legislators in Michigan
Democratic Party members of the Michigan House of Representatives
1886 births
1975 deaths